Nancy Patricia Pelosi (born March 26, 1940) is an American politician who served as the 52nd speaker of the United States House of Representatives from 2007 to 2011 and again from 2019 to 2023. A member of the Democratic Party, she was the first woman elected Speaker and the first woman to lead a major political party in either chamber of Congress, leading the House Democrats for 20 years, from 2003 to 2023. She has represented  in the United States House of Representatives since 1987. The district, numbered as the 5th district from 1987 to 1993, the 8th from 1993 to 2013, and the 12th from 2013 to 2023, includes most of the city of San Francisco.

Pelosi was born and raised in Baltimore, the daughter of mayor and congressman Thomas D'Alesandro. She graduated from Trinity College, Washington, in 1962 and married businessman Paul Pelosi the next year; the two had met while both were students. They moved to New York City before settling down in San Francisco with their children. Focused on raising her family, Pelosi stepped into politics as a volunteer for the Democratic Party. She was first elected to Congress in a 1987 special election and is now in her 19th term; she is the dean of California's congressional delegation. Pelosi steadily rose through the ranks of the House Democratic Caucus to be elected House minority whip in 2002 and elevated to House minority leader a year later, becoming the first woman to hold each of those positions in either chamber of Congress.

In the 2006 midterm elections, Pelosi led the Democrats to a majority in the House for the first time in 12 years and was subsequently elected Speaker, becoming the first woman to hold the office. During her first speakership, Pelosi was a major opponent of the Iraq War as well as the Bush administration's attempts to partially privatize Social Security. She participated in the passage of the Obama administration's landmark bills, including the Affordable Care Act, the Dodd–Frank Wall Street Reform and Consumer Protection Act, the Don't Ask, Don't Tell Repeal Act, the American Recovery and Reinvestment Act of 2009, and the 2010 Tax Relief Act. Pelosi lost the speakership after the Republican Party retook the majority in the 2010 midterm elections, but she retained her role as leader of the House Democrats and became House minority leader for a second time.

In the 2018 midterm elections, Democrats regained majority control of the House, and Pelosi was again elected Speaker, becoming the first former speaker to reclaim the gavel since Sam Rayburn in 1955. During her second speakership, the House twice impeached President Donald Trump, first in December 2019 and again in January 2021; the Senate acquitted Trump both times. She participated in the passage of the Biden administration's landmark bills, including the American Rescue Plan Act of 2021, the Infrastructure Investment and Jobs Act, the CHIPS and Science Act, the Inflation Reduction Act of 2022, and the Respect for Marriage Act. In the 2022 midterm elections, Republicans regained control of the House for the new Congress, ending her tenure as speaker. On November 29, 2022, the Steering and Policy Committee of the House Democratic Caucus named Pelosi "Speaker Emerita".

Early life and education

Nancy Pelosi was born in Baltimore, Maryland, to an Italian-American family. She was the only daughter and the youngest of seven children of Annunciata M. "Nancy" D'Alesandro (née Lombardi) and Thomas D'Alesandro Jr. Her mother was born in Fornelli, Isernia, Molise, in Southern Italy, and immigrated to the U.S. in 1912; her father traced his Italian ancestry to Genoa, Venice and Abruzzo. When Pelosi was born, her father was a Democratic congressman from Maryland. He became Baltimore mayor seven years later. Pelosi's mother was also active in politics, organizing Democratic women and teaching her daughter political skills. Pelosi's brother, Thomas D'Alesandro III, also a Democrat, was elected Baltimore City Council president and later served as mayor from 1967 to 1971.

Pelosi helped her father at his campaign events, and she attended President John F. Kennedy's inaugural address in January 1961.

In 1958, Pelosi graduated from the Institute of Notre Dame, an all-girls Catholic high school in Baltimore. In 1962, she graduated from Trinity College in Washington, D.C., with a Bachelor of Arts in political science. Pelosi interned for Senator Daniel Brewster (D-Maryland) in the 1960s alongside future House Majority Leader Steny Hoyer.

Early career

After moving to San Francisco, Pelosi became friends with 5th district congressman Phillip Burton and began working her way up in Democratic politics. In 1976, she was elected as a Democratic National Committee member from California, a position she would hold until 1996. She was elected as party chair for Northern California in 1977, and four years later was selected to head the California Democratic Party, which she led until 1983. Subsequently, Pelosi served as the San Francisco Democratic National Convention Host Committee chairwoman in 1984, and then as Democratic Senatorial Campaign Committee finance chair from 1985 to 1986.

U.S. House of Representatives

Elections

 
Phillip Burton died in 1983 and his wife, Sala Burton, won a special election to fill the remainder of her husband's congressional term. She was subsequently reelected to two more terms in her own right. Burton became ill with cancer in late 1986 and decided not to run for reelection in 1988. She picked Pelosi as her designated successor, guaranteeing her the support of the Burtons' contacts. Burton died on February 1, 1987, just a month after being sworn in for a second full term. Pelosi won the special election to succeed her, defeating Democratic San Francisco supervisor Harry Britt on April 7, 1987, and defeating Republican Harriet Ross in a June 2 runoff. Pelosi took office a week later.

Democrats have held Pelosi's seat since 1949 and Republicans, who make up only 13% of registered voters in the district, have not made a serious bid for the seat since the early 1960s. Pelosi was reelected in 1988 and has been reelected another 16 times with no substantive opposition, winning with an average of 80% of the vote. She has not participated in candidates' debates since her 1987 race against Harriet Ross.

For the 2000 and 2002 election cycles, compared to other members of Congress, she contributed the most money to other congressional campaigns.

Committee assignments

In the House, she served on the Appropriations and Intelligence Committees and was the ranking member on the on the latter committee until her election as House minority leader.

Pelosi is a member of the House Baltic Caucus.

Pre-speakership career 
In March 1988, Pelosi voted in favor of the Civil Rights Restoration Act of 1987 (as well as to override President Ronald Reagan's veto).

In 2001, Pelosi was elected the House minority whip, second-in-command to Minority Leader Dick Gephardt of Missouri. She was the first woman in U.S. history to hold that post.

In 2002, after Gephardt resigned as House minority leader to seek the Democratic nomination in the 2004 presidential election, Pelosi was elected to replace him, becoming the first woman to lead a major party in either chamber of Congress.

First speakership (2007–2011)

Nomination

In the 2006 elections, the Democrats took control of the House, picking up 30 seats. The change in control meant as House Minority Leader, Pelosi was widely expected to become Speaker of the House in the next Congress. On November 16, 2006, the Democratic caucus unanimously chose Pelosi as the Democratic candidate for Speaker.

Pelosi supported her longtime friend, John Murtha of Pennsylvania, for the position of House majority leader, the second-ranking post in the House Democratic caucus. His competitor was House Minority Whip Steny Hoyer of Maryland, who had been Pelosi's second-in-command since 2003. Hoyer was elected as House majority leader over Murtha by a margin of 149–86 within the caucus.

On January 4, 2007, Pelosi defeated Republican John Boehner of Ohio, 233 votes to 202, in the election for Speaker of the House.

Rahm Emanuel of Illinois, the incoming chairman of the House Democratic Caucus, nominated Pelosi, and her longtime friend John Dingell of Michigan swore her in, as the dean of the House of Representatives traditionally does.

With her election, Pelosi became the first woman, the first Californian, and the first Italian-American to hold the speakership. She was also the second Speaker from a state west of the Rocky Mountains. The first was Washington's Tom Foley, the last Democrat to hold the post before Pelosi.

During her speech, she discussed the historical importance of being the first female to hold the position of Speaker:

She also said Iraq was the major issue facing the 110th Congress while incorporating some Democratic Party beliefs:

Tenure

As Speaker, Pelosi was still the leader of the House Democrats; the Speaker is considered to be the leader of the majority House caucus. However, by tradition, she did not normally participate in debate and almost never voted on the floor, though she had the right to do so as a member of the House. She was also not a member of any House committees, also keeping with Speaker tradition.

Pelosi was reelected as Speaker in 2009. During and after her first tenure as Speaker, she was perceived and/or characterized as a contentious political figure. Republican candidates frequently associated their Democratic opponents with her. At times, centrists, progressive candidates and incumbent Democrats all expressed opposition to her continued tenure.

Social Security

Shortly after being reelected in 2004, President George W. Bush claimed a mandate for an ambitious second-term agenda and proposed reforming Social Security by allowing workers to redirect a portion of their Social Security withholding into stock and bond investments. Pelosi strongly opposed the plan, saying there was no crisis, and as minority leader she imposed intense party discipline on her caucus, leading them to near-unanimous opposition to the proposal, which was defeated.

Blocking of impeachment proceedings against President Bush

In the wake of Bush's 2004 reelection, several leading House Democrats believed they should pursue impeachment proceedings against him, asserting that he had misled Congress about weapons of mass destruction in Iraq and violated Americans' civil liberties by authorizing warrantless wiretaps.

In May 2006, with an eye on the upcoming midterm elections—which offered the possibility of Democrats taking back control of the House for the first time since 1994—Pelosi told colleagues that, while the Democrats would conduct vigorous oversight of Bush administration policy, an impeachment investigation was "off the table". A week earlier, she had told The Washington Post that, although Democrats would not set out to impeach Bush, "you never know where" investigations might lead.

After becoming Speaker in January 2007, Pelosi held firm against impeachment, notwithstanding strong support for it among her constituents. In the November 2008 election, she withstood a challenge for her seat by antiwar activist Cindy Sheehan, who ran as an independent primarily because of Pelosi's refusal to pursue impeachment.

The "Hundred Hours"

Before the midterm elections, Pelosi announced that if Democrats gained a House majority, they would push through most of their agenda during the first 100 hours of the 110th Congress.

The "first hundred hours" was a play on President Franklin D. Roosevelt's promise for quick action to combat the Great Depression during his "first hundred days" in office. Newt Gingrich, who became Speaker of the House in 1995, had a similar 100-day agenda to implement his Contract with America.

Opposition to Iraq War troop surge of 2007

On January 5, 2007, reacting to suggestions from Bush's confidants that he would increase troop levels in Iraq (which he announced in a speech a few days later), Pelosi and Senate Majority Leader Harry Reid condemned the plan. They sent Bush a letter reading:

2008 Democratic National Convention

Pelosi was named Permanent Chair of the 2008 Democratic National Convention in Denver, Colorado.

Healthcare reform

Pelosi has been credited for spearheading Obama's health care law, the Affordable Care Act, when it seemed doomed to defeat. After Republican Scott Brown won Democrat Ted Kennedy's former Senate seat in the January 2010 Massachusetts special election, costing Democrats their filibuster-proof majority, Obama agreed with his then chief of staff Rahm Emanuel's idea to do smaller initiatives that could pass easily. But Pelosi dismissed Obama's compunction, mocking his scaled-back ideas as "kiddie care." After convincing him that this would be their only shot at health care reform because of the large Democratic majorities in Congress, she rallied her caucus as she began an "unbelievable marathon" of a two-month session to craft the bill, which passed the House 219–212. In Obama's remarks before signing the bill into law, he credited Pelosi as "one of the best Speakers the House of Representatives has ever had."

House minority leader (2011–2019)

112th and 113th Congress

Though Pelosi was reelected by a comfortable margin in the 2010 elections, the Democrats lost 63 seats and control of the House of Representatives to the Republicans. After this setback, Pelosi sought to continue leading the House Democratic Caucus as minority leader, the office she held before becoming Speaker. Disparate intraparty opposition failed to pass a motion to delay the leadership vote, although she faced a challenge from conservative Democratic representative Heath Shuler from North Carolina. Shuler lost to Pelosi 150–43 in the caucus vote on November 17, 2010. On the opening day of the 112th Congress, Pelosi was elected minority leader.

In November 2011, 60 Minutes alleged that Pelosi and several other members of Congress had used information they gleaned from closed sessions to make money on the stock market. The program cited her purchases of Visa Inc. stock while a bill that would limit credit card fees was in the House. Pelosi denied the allegations and called the report "a right-wing smear". When the Stop Trading on Congressional Knowledge Act (or STOCK Act) was introduced the next year, she voted for it and lauded its passing. Of representatives Louise Slaughter and Tim Walz, who drafted the bill, Pelosi said they "shined a light on a gaping hole in our ethics laws and helped close it once and for all".

On November 14, 2012, she announced she would remain Democratic leader.

114th and 115th Congress

In August 2016, Pelosi said that her personal contact information had been posted online following a cyberattack against top Democratic campaign committees and she had received "obscene and sick calls, voice mails and text messages". She warned members of Congress to avoid letting children or family members answer phone calls or read text messages.

Prompted by colleagues after the 2016 presidential election, Tim Ryan of Ohio initiated a bid to replace Pelosi as House minority leader on November 17, 2016. After Pelosi agreed to give more leadership opportunities to junior members, she defeated Ryan by a vote of 134–63 on November 30.

In 2017, after Democrats lost four consecutive special elections in the House of Representatives, Pelosi's leadership was again called into question. In June 2017, Representative Kathleen Rice of New York and a small group of other House Democrats, including Congressional Black Caucus chairman Cedric Richmond, held a closed-door meeting to discuss potential new Democratic leadership. Other House Democrats, including Ryan, Seth Moulton, and Filemon Vela, publicly called for new House leadership. In an interview, Rice said, "If you were talking about a company that was posting losing numbers, if you were talking about any sports team that was losing time and time again, changes would be made, right? The CEO out. The coach would be out and there would be a new strategy put in place." In a press conference, Pelosi defended her leadership, saying, "I respect any opinion that my members have but my decision about how long I stay is not up to them." When asked specifically why she should stay on as House minority leader after numerous Democratic seats were lost, she responded, "Well, I'm a master legislator. I am a strategic, politically astute leader. My leadership is recognized by many around the country, and that is why I'm able to attract the support that I do."

In November 2017, after Pelosi called for John Conyers's resignation over allegations of harassment, she convened the first in a series of planned meetings on strategies to address reforming workplace policies in the wake of national attention to sexual harassment. She said Congress had "a moral duty to the brave women and men coming forward to seize this moment and demonstrate real, effective leadership to foster a climate of respect and dignity in the workplace".

In February 2018, Pelosi sent a letter to Speaker Paul Ryan about the proposed public release of a memo prepared by Republican staff at the direction of House Intelligence Committee Chairman Devin Nunes. The memo attacked the Federal Bureau of Investigation for its investigation of Russian interference in the 2016 United States elections. Pelosi said the FBI and the Department of Justice had warned Nunes and Ryan that the memo was inaccurate and that its release could threaten national security by disclosing federal surveillance methods. She added that Republicans were engaged in a "cover-up campaign" to protect Trump: "House Republicans' pattern of obstruction and cover-up to hide the truth about the Trump-Russia scandal represents a threat to our intelligence and our national security. The GOP has led a partisan effort to distort intelligence and discredit the U.S. law enforcement and intelligence communities." She charged Nunes with "deliberately dishonest actions" and called for his immediate removal from his position.

In February 2018, Pelosi broke the record for longest House speech using the "magic minute" custom when she spent more than eight hours recounting stories from DREAMers—people brought to the United States as minors by undocumented immigrants—to object to a budget deal that would raise spending caps without addressing the future of DACA recipients, who were at risk of deportation by the Trump administration.

In May 2018, after the White House invited two Republicans and no Democrats to a Department of Justice briefing on an FBI informant who had made contact with the Trump campaign, Pelosi and Schumer sent a letter to Deputy Attorney General Rod Rosenstein and FBI director Wray calling for "a bipartisan Gang of Eight briefing that involves congressional leadership from both chambers".

In August 2018, Pelosi called for Duncan D. Hunter's resignation after his indictment on charges of misusing at least $250,000 in campaign funds, saying the charges were "evidence of the rampant culture of corruption among Republicans in Washington today".

Second speakership (2019–2023)

In the 2018 elections, the Democrats regained a majority in the House. On November 28, House Democrats nominated Pelosi to once again serve as Speaker. She was reelected to the speakership at the start of the 116th Congress on January 3, 2019. Pelosi "clinched the speakership after weeks of whittling down opposition from some fellow Democrats seeking a new generation of leadership. The deal to win over holdouts put an expiration date on her tenure: she promised not to stay more than four years in the job". 220 House Democrats voted for Pelosi as Speaker and 15 for someone else or no one.

On February 4, 2020, at the conclusion of Trump's State of the Union address, Pelosi tore up her official copy of it. Her stated reason for doing so was "because it was a courteous thing to do considering the alternatives. It was a such a dirty speech." Trump and other Republicans criticized her for this.

In December 2021, Pelosi announced her candidacy for reelection to the House in 2022. In 2018, and again in 2020, she had agreed not to stay on as Speaker beyond January 2023, but otherwise avoided questions about her future. In 2022, Pelosi was reelected, but the Democratic Party lost the House majority. Ten days later, she announced that she would not seek a Democratic leadership post in the next Congress. 

On November 29, 2022, the Steering and Policy Committee of the House Democratic Caucus named Pelosi "Speaker Emerita". Her second speakership, and her participation in the House Democratic Party leadership, concluded on January 3, 2023, at the end of the 117th Congress.

2018–2019 government shutdown 

At the start of the 116th Congress, Pelosi opposed Trump's attempts to use the 2018–2019 federal government shutdown (which she called a "hostage-taking" of civil servants) as leverage to build a substantial wall on the American border. She declined to allow Trump to give the State of the Union Address in the House of Representatives chamber while the shutdown was ongoing. After several polls showed Trump's popularity sharply falling due to the shutdown, on January 25, 2019, Trump signed a stopgap bill to reopen the government without any concessions regarding a border wall for three weeks to allow negotiations on an appropriations bill. But he reiterated his demand for the border wall funding and said he would shut the government down again or declare a national emergency and use military funding to build the wall if Congress did not appropriate the funds by February 15.

On February 15, Trump declared a national emergency in order to bypass Congress, after being unsatisfied with a bipartisan bill that had passed the House and Senate the day before.

Impeachments of President Trump 

On September 29, 2019, Pelosi announced the launch of an impeachment inquiry against Trump. On December 5, 2019, after the inquiry had taken place, Pelosi authorized the Judiciary Committee to begin drafting articles of impeachment. After hearings were held, two articles of impeachment were announced on December 10. The House of Representatives approved both articles on December 18, thereby formally impeaching Trump. On the eve of Trump's trial before the U.S. Senate, The Washington Post political writer Paul Kane called Pelosi the most powerful House Speaker in at least 25 years, noting that some historians were comparing her influence to that of former Speaker Sam Rayburn.

The day after the January 6 United States Capitol attack, Pelosi demanded that Trump either resign or be removed from office through the clauses of section four the Twenty-Fifth Amendment to the United States Constitution, threatening impeachment if this did not happen. On January 10, she issued a 24-hour ultimatum to Vice President Mike Pence, that if he did not invoke the 25th amendment, she would proceed with legislation to impeach Trump. On January 13, the House of Representatives voted to impeach Trump a second time.

COVID-19 pandemic and response 

Pelosi aided with the passage of the CARES Act. She attracted controversy when footage emerged in early September 2020 of her visiting a hair salon in San Francisco. This was contrary to regulations enforced at that time preventing service indoors. Criticized for hypocrisy by Trump and the owners of the salon, Pelosi described the situation as "clearly a setup". Her stylist and other Democrats defended her.

Biden administration

Political positions

Pelosi was a founding member of the Congressional Progressive Caucus, but left in 2003 after being elected House minority leader.

Civil liberties and human rights

In 2001, she voted in favor of the USA Patriot Act, but voted against reauthorization of certain provisions in 2005. She voted against a Constitutional amendment banning flag-burning.

Immigration

Pelosi voted against the Secure Fence Act of 2006.

In June 2018, Pelosi visited a federal facility used to detain migrant children separated from their parents and subsequently called for the resignation of Department of Homeland Security Secretary Kirstjen Nielsen. In July, Pelosi characterized the compromise immigration bill by the Republicans as a "deal with the devil" and said she had not had conversations with House Speaker Ryan about a legislative solution to the separation of families at the southern border.

In April 2021, after southern border crossings peaked, House Republicans criticized Pelosi for saying that immigration under the Biden administration was "on a good path". U.S. Customs and Border Protection reported that nearly 19,000 unaccompanied minors arrived in March.

LGBT rights

Pelosi has long supported LGBT rights. In 1996, she voted against the Defense of Marriage Act, and in 2004 and 2006, she voted against the proposed Federal Marriage Amendment, which would amend the United States Constitution to define marriage federally as being between one man and one woman, thereby overriding states' individual rights to legalize same-sex marriage. When the Supreme Court of California overturned the state's ban on marriage between same-sex couples in 2008, Pelosi released a statement welcoming the "historic decision". She also indirectly voiced her opposition to California Proposition 8, a successful 2008 state ballot initiative which defined marriage in California as a union between one man and one woman.

In 2012, Pelosi said her position on LGBT rights such as same-sex marriage grows from and reflects her Catholic faith; it also places her at odds with Catholic doctrine, which defines marriage as a union between one man and one woman. She said: "My religion compels me—and I love it for it—to be against discrimination of any kind in our country, and I consider [the ban on gay marriage] a form of discrimination. I think it's unconstitutional on top of that."

Pelosi supports the Equality Act, a bill that would expand the federal Civil Rights Act of 1964 to ban discrimination based on sexual orientation and gender identity. In 2019, she spoke in Congress in favor of the bill and called for ending discrimination against LGBT people. Pelosi also opposes Trump's transgender military ban.

Marijuana

Pelosi supports reform in marijuana laws, although NORML's deputy director Paul Armentano said she and other members of Congress had not done anything to change the laws. She also supports use of medical marijuana.

PRISM

Pelosi supports the Bush/Obama NSA surveillance program PRISM.

Removal of Confederate monuments

As Speaker of the House, Pelosi quietly moved the statue of Robert E. Lee from the National Statuary Hall of the U.S. Capitol to the Capitol crypt. In Lee's place, she had a statue of Rosa Parks erected. In August 2017, Pelosi said she supported the removal of Confederate monuments and memorials from the Capitol Building.

Waterboarding

In 2002, while Pelosi was the ranking member of the House Intelligence Committee, she was briefed on the ongoing use of "enhanced interrogation techniques", including waterboarding, authorized for a captured terrorist, Abu Zubaydah. After the briefing, Pelosi said she "was assured by lawyers with the CIA and the Department of Justice that the methods were legal". Two unnamed former Bush administration officials say the briefing was detailed and graphic, and at the time she did not raise substantial objections. One unnamed U.S. official present during the early briefings said, "In fairness, the environment was different then because we were closer to September 11 and people were still in a panic. But there was no objecting, no hand-wringing. The attitude was, 'We don't care what you do to those guys as long as you get the information you need to protect the American people.'"

These techniques later became controversial, and in 2007 Pelosi's office said she had protested their use at the time, and she concurred with objections raised by Democratic colleague Jane Harman in a letter to the CIA in early 2003. Subsequently, several leading Democratic lawmakers in the House signed a letter on June 26, 2009, alleging CIA Director Leon Panetta had asserted that the CIA misled Congress for a "number of years" spanning back to 2001, casting clouds on the controversy. The letter, lawmakers and the CIA all providing no details, and the circumstances surrounding the allegations, make it hard to assess the claims and counterclaims of both sides.

Officials in Congress say her ability to challenge the practices may have been hampered by strict rules of secrecy that prohibited her from taking notes or consulting legal experts or members of her own staffs. In an April 2009 press conference, Pelosi said: "In that or any other briefing... we were not, and I repeat, were not told that waterboarding or any of these other enhanced interrogation techniques were used. What they did tell us is that they had some legislative counsel—the Office of Legislative Counsel opinions that they could be used, but not that they would. And they further [...] the point was that if and when they would be used, they would brief Congress at that time."

Economy

Fiscal policy

Pelosi voted against the 1995 Balanced Budget Proposed Constitutional Amendment, which passed the House by a 300–132 vote, but fell two votes short of the 2/3 supermajority required in the Senate (with 65 senators voting in favor).

As Speaker of the House, she spearheaded the Fair Minimum Wage Act of 2007 as part of the 100-Hour Plan. The act raises the minimum wage in the United States and the territories of the Northern Marianas Islands and American Samoa. American Samoa was initially absent from the act, but it was included as part of HR 2206. One Republican congressman who voted against the initial bill accused Pelosi of unethically benefiting Del Monte Foods (headquartered in her district) by excluding the territory, where Del Monte's StarKist Tuna brand is a major employer. Pelosi co-sponsored legislation that omitted American Samoa from a raise in the minimum wage as early as 1999, before Del Monte's acquisition of StarKist Tuna in 2002.

Pelosi opposed the welfare reform President Bush proposed as well as reforms proposed and passed under President Clinton. She also opposed the tax reform signed by Trump in December 2017, calling it "probably one of the worst bills in the history of the United States of America... It robs from the future [and] it rewards the rich... and corporations at the expense of tens of millions of working middle-class families in our country." She said "this is Armageddon" and argued that the tax bill increased the debt in a way that would adversely impact social insurance spending. In January 2018, shortly after the tax bill passed, a reporter asked Pelosi to respond to statements by companies crediting the tax cuts with allowing them to raise wages and give bonuses. She said that, given the benefits corporations received from the tax bill, the benefits workers got were "crumbs". Most companies that awarded bonuses gave out payments of hundreds of dollars, while some gave bonuses significantly over $1,000.

Infrastructure

In November 2018, Pelosi said she had spoken with Trump about infrastructure development. Though he "really didn't come through with it in his first two years in office" while it was a topic during his campaign, the subject had not been a partisan matter in Congress. She mentioned potential bipartisan legislative initiatives that would "create good paying jobs and will also generate other economic growth in their regions". On May 1, 2019, Pelosi and Schumer met with Trump about infrastructure funding. In late May, a meeting to discuss an impending $2trillion infrastructure plan was cut short when Trump abruptly left after only a few minutes.

Disaster relief

In August 2018, after Trump signed an emergency declaration for federal aid in combating the Carr Fire in Northern California, Pelosi called the move "an important first step" but requested that Trump accede to California Governor Jerry Brown's request for further aid to other hard-hit areas in California. She called on the Trump administration to take "real, urgent action to combat the threat of the climate crisis, which is making the wildfire season longer, more expensive and more destructive".

Education

In 1999, Pelosi voted against displaying the Ten Commandments in public buildings, including schools. She voted for the No Child Left Behind Act, which instituted testing to track students' progress and authorized an increase in overall education spending.

Environment

In 2019, Pelosi said climate change was "the existential threat of our time" and called for action to curb it. She has supported the development of new technologies to reduce U.S. dependence on foreign oil and remediate the adverse environmental effects of burning fossil fuels. Pelosi has widely supported conservation programs and energy research appropriations. She has also voted to remove an amendment that would allow for oil and gas exploration in the Arctic National Wildlife Refuge.

Pelosi has blocked efforts to revive offshore oil drilling in protected areas, reasoning that offshore drilling could lead to an increase in dependence on fossil fuels.

Health care

Affordable Care Act

Pelosi was instrumental in passing the Patient Protection and Affordable Care Act of 2010. She was a key figure in convincing Obama to continue pushing for health-care reform after the election of Massachusetts Senator Scott Brown in a January special election—a defeat seen as potentially fatal to Democratic reform efforts. After delivering 219 votes in the House for Obama's health-care package, Pelosi was both praised and heckled as she made her way to Capitol Hill.

Pelosi has voted to increase Medicare and Medicaid benefits. She does not endorse Senator Bernie Sanders's bill for single-payer healthcare.

On March 10, 2017, Pelosi said Democrats would continue battling Republican efforts to repeal the Affordable Care Act, but would also be willing to form a compromise measure if Republicans reached out for support. She indicated her support for the Republican plan to expand Health Savings Accounts and said the question of Republicans' accepting an expansion of Medicaid was important. In September, Pelosi sent a letter to Democrats praising Senator John McCain for announcing his opposition to the latest Republican effort to repeal and replace the Affordable Care Act and called on lawmakers and advocacy groups alike to pressure Republicans in the health-care discussion. She said Democrats would be unified in putting "a stake in the heart of this monstrous bill".

In July 2018, during a speech at Independence First, Pelosi said Democrats' goal "has always been to expand coverage and to do so in a way that improves benefits... and we have to address the affordability issue that is so undermined by the Republicans." In November 2018, after Democrats gained a majority in the House in the midterm elections, she said, "I'm staying as Speaker to protect the Affordable Care Act. That's my main issue, because I think that's, again, about the health and financial health of the America's families, and if Hillary had won, I could go home." She added that Republicans had misrepresented their earlier position of opposition to covering people with preexisting conditions during the election cycle and called on them to join Democrats in "removing all doubt that the preexisting medical condition is the law—the benefit—is the law of the land".

Abortion

Pelosi voted against the Partial-Birth Abortion Ban Act of 2003 and earlier attempts at similar bans, and voted against the criminalization of certain situations where a minor is transported across state lines for an abortion (HR 748, passed).

She has voted in favor of lifting the ban on privately funded abortions at overseas U.S. military facilities (HA 209, rejected); in favor of an amendment that would repeal a provision forbidding servicewomen and dependents from getting an abortion in overseas military hospitals (HA 722, rejected); and in favor of stripping the prohibition of funding for organizations working overseas that use their own funds to provide abortion services, or engage in advocacy related to abortion services (HA 997, rejected). She also voted in favor of the 1998 Abortion Funding Amendment, which would have allowed the use of district funds to promote abortion-related activities, but would have prohibited the use of federal funds.

In 2008, she was rebuked by Archbishop Donald Wuerl of Washington, D.C., for being "incorrect" in comments she made to Tom Brokaw on Meet the Press concerning Church teaching on the subjects of abortion of when a human life begins. The archbishop's statement quoted Pelosi as saying the church has not been able to define when life begins. During the interview she said, "over the history of the church, this [what constitutes the moment of conception] is an issue of controversy." In February 2009, Pelosi met with her bishop, Archbishop George Hugh Niederauer of San Francisco, and with Pope Benedict XVI regarding the controversy.

Pelosi opposed the 2022 overturning of Roe v. Wade, calling it "cruel", "outrageous" and "heart-wrenching".

Contraception

In a January 25, 2009, interview with George Stephanopoulos for ABC News, Pelosi said that one of the reasons she supported family planning services was that they would "reduce costs to states and to the federal government."

Security

Gun laws

Pelosi stands in favor of increased background checks for potential gun owners, as well as the banning of assault weapons. In February 2013, she called for the "Boldest possible move" on gun control, similar to a stance made just weeks earlier by former Representative, mass shooting victim, and fellow gun control advocate Gabby Giffords. In 2012, she was given a 0% rating by Gun Owners of America and a 7% rating from the National Rifle Association for her stances on gun control.

In February 2018, following the Stoneman Douglas High School shooting, Pelosi said Republicans' "cowering" to the gun lobby was "an assault on our whole country" and that the victims were "paying the price for our inaction". She requested House Speaker Ryan and Republicans take action via consideration of legislation expanding background checks or authorizing researchers to use federal dollars to examine public health as it relates to gun violence. Pelosi also advocated for the creation of a special committee on gun violence and said Republicans had previously created committees to investigate Planned Parenthood and the 2012 Benghazi attack.

In November 2018, after the Thousand Oaks shooting, Pelosi released a statement saying Americans "deserve real action to end the daily epidemic of gun violence that is stealing the lives of our children on campuses, in places of worship and on our streets" and pledged that gun control would be a priority for House Democrats in the 116th United States Congress.

Military draft

With regard to Representative Charles Rangel's (D-NY) plan to introduce legislation that would reinstate the draft, Pelosi said she did not support it.

Use of government aircraft

In March 2009, the New York Post wrote that the conservative watchdog group Judicial Watch had obtained emails sent by Pelosi's staff requesting the United States Air Force (USAF) to provide specific aircraft—a Boeing 757—for Pelosi to use for taxpayer-funded travel. Pelosi responded that the policy was initiated by President Bush due to post-9/11 security concerns (Pelosi was third in line for presidential succession), and was initially provided for the previous Speaker Dennis Hastert. The Sergeant at Arms requested—for security reasons—that the plane provided be capable of non-stop flight, requiring a larger aircraft. The Pentagon said "no one has rendered judgment" that Pelosi's use of aircraft "is excessive".

Trump presidency

During Trump administration, Pelosi voted in line with the president's stated position 17.6% of the time.

During a news conference on June 9, 2017, after a reporter asked her about tweets by President Donald Trump lambasting former FBI director James Comey following Comey's testimony to the Senate Intelligence Committee, Pelosi said no one at the White House seemed courageous enough to tell Trump his tweets were beneath the dignity of the presidency and that she was worried about his fitness for office. In November, when asked about Democrats beginning the impeachment process against Trump in the event they won a majority of seats in the 2018 elections, Pelosi said it would not be one of their legislative priorities but that the option could be considered if credible evidence appeared during the ongoing investigations into Russian interference in the 2016 election.

In January 2018, Pelosi referred to Trump's 2018 State of the Union Address as a performance without serious policy ideas the parties could collaborate on. She questioned Trump's refusal to implement Russian sanctions after more than 500 members of Congress voted to approve them. In February, after Trump blocked the release of a Democratic memo by the Intelligence Committee, Pelosi said the act was "a stunningly brazen attempt to cover up the truth about the Trump-Russia scandal from the American people" and "part of a dangerous and desperate pattern of cover-up on the part of the president who has shown he had something to hide." In March, Pelosi said she was "more concerned about the president's policies which undermine the financial security of America's working families" than the Stormy Daniels–Donald Trump scandal. Pelosi did note the scandal as having highlighted a double standard of Republicans on issues of family values and expectations of presidential behavior, saying the party would be very involved if the event was happening to a Democrat. In April, following Scooter Libby being pardoned by Trump, Pelosi released a statement saying the pardon "sends a troubling signal to the president's allies that obstructing justice will be rewarded and that the idea of those who lie under oath being granted a pardon "poses a threat to the integrity of the special counsel investigation, and to our democracy". On August 15, after Trump revoked the security clearance of former CIA director John Brennan, Pelosi said the move was "a stunning abuse of power [and] a pathetic attempt to silence critics", and an attempt by Trump to distract attention from other issues of his administration. Pelosi and Charles E. Schumer met with Trump and Pence in December 2018 to discuss changes to be made when the new Democratic representatives takes office in 2019. In January 2019 she supported President Trump in his decision to back the leader of the opposition Juan Guaidó during Venezuelan protests and constitutional crisis.

Trump–Ukraine scandal and impeachment

The Democrats gained control of the House of Representatives in the November 2018 elections, and Pelosi took office as Speaker. Multiple House committees launched investigations into various actions by Trump and some of his cabinet members and requested or subpoenaed documents and information from the White House and the administration. In April 2019, Trump vowed to defy "all" subpoenas from the House and to refuse to allow current or former administration officials to testify before House committees.

Pelosi initially resisted efforts by some fellow House Democrats to pursue Trump's impeachment, but in September 2019, following revelations of the Trump–Ukraine scandal, announced the beginning of a formal House impeachment inquiry, saying "The actions taken to date by the president have seriously violated the Constitution" and that Trump "must be held accountable—no one is above the law." Privately, Pelosi expressed concern that focusing on impeachment would imperil the Democrats' House majority; she preferred to focus on other legislation.

In May 2019, the White House intervened to halt former White House Counsel Don McGahn from complying with a subpoena issued by the House Judiciary Committee, instructing the committee to redirect its records requests to the White House. Pelosi, who had previously urged "Democrats to focus on fact-finding rather than the prospect of any impeachment", described Trump's interference regarding McGahn's records as an obstruction of justice, saying that "Trump is goading us to impeach him." Later that month, as the Trump administration continued to ignore subpoenas, refuse to release documents, and encourage or order current and former officials not to testify in Congress, Pelosi declared: "we believe that the president of the United States is engaged in a cover-up." Later that day, after learning of Pelosi's comments, Trump walked away from a scheduled White House meeting with Pelosi and Schumer, in which a $2trillion infrastructure plan was supposed to be discussed. Trump told Pelosi and Schumer he could not work with them until they stopped investigating him. Later in the day, Pelosi accused Trump of "obstructing justice" and again said he "is engaged in a cover-up". On June 5, 2019, during a meeting with senior Democrats about whether the House should launch impeachment proceeding against Trump, Pelosi said, "I don't want to see him impeached, I want to see him in prison." According to multiple sources, rather than impeachment, she wanted to see Trump lose to a Democrat in the 2020 election, following which he could be prosecuted. Eventually, under pressure from an alliance of left-wing Representatives led by Chair of the House Judiciary Committee Jerry Nadler, Pelosi backed an impeachement inquiry.

The House impeachment inquiry focused on efforts by Trump and Trump administration officials to pressure the government of Ukraine to smear former Vice President Joe Biden, a political rival of Trump's, while withholding $400million in U.S. military aid, and a White House visit, from Ukraine; the inquiry also examined Trump's request in a July 2019 phone call to Ukrainian president Volodymyr Zelensky to "do us a favor" and investigate Biden. On December 18, 2019, the House voted nearly along party lines to impeach Trump for abuse of power (230–197) and obstruction of Congress (229–198), making him the third president in U.S. history to be impeached. Pelosi said, when opening debate on the articles of impeachment, "If we do not act now, we would be derelict in our duty. It is tragic that the president's reckless actions make impeachment necessary. He gave us no choice." Pelosi initially did not transmit the articles of impeachment to the Republican-controlled Senate for trial, seeking to negotiate an agreement with Senate Majority Mitch McConnell for the Senate to hear witness testimony and other additional evidence as part of a bid for a "full and fair" trial. McConnell rejected these efforts, and the House transmitted the articles to the Senate on January 15, 2020, with Pelosi naming seven Democratic Representatives, led by Representative Adam Schiff, as the House managers to argue the impeachment case against Trump in the Senate. As expected, the Senate ultimately acquitted Trump in a nearly-party line vote in which every Democrat voted for conviction and all but one Republican, Senator Mitt Romney, voting for acquittal. Ahead of the Senate vote Pelosi said that, irrespective of the outcome, the president "has been impeached forever", that the impeachment process had successfully "pulled back a veil of behavior totally unacceptable to our founders, and that the public will see this with a clearer eye, an unblurred eye." Following the Senate vote, Pelosi criticized Trump and Senate Republicans, saying their actions had "normalized lawlessness and rejected the system of checks and balances".

Following the Senate vote, Trump claimed vindication and criticized Democrats, the FBI, and Pelosi. In a speech at the National Prayer Breakfast, Trump referred to Pelosi as "a horrible person", and questioned her religious faith; Pelosi said these remarks were "particularly without class". Before Trump's February 4, 2020 State of the Union Address, the day before the Senate impeachment vote, Trump and Pelosi exchanged mutual snubs. Trump refused to shake Pelosi's outstretched hand, and Pelosi tore up her copy of Trump's speech. Her stated reason for doing so was "because it was a courteous thing to do considering the alternatives. It was a such a dirty speech." Pelosi also said Trump's speech "had no contact with reality whatsoever" and suggested the president appeared "a little sedated" during the address. Pelosi's action was criticized by Trump and others.

Days after the Senate impeachment vote, Trump fired two officials who had testified against him during the impeachment inquiry: U.S. Ambassador to the European Union Gordon Sondland and Lieutenant Colonel Alexander Vindman, a National Security Council official. Pelosi called the firing of Vindman a "shameful" and "clear and brazen act of retaliation that showcases the President's fear of the truth", saying that "History will remember Lieutenant Colonel Vindman as an American hero."

Commission to consider use of 25th Amendment

On October 8, 2020, Pelosi announced that legislation was being introduced in the House of Representatives to advance the creation of a commission to allow the use of the 25th Amendment to the Constitution to intervene and remove Trump from executive duties.

Biden presidency
As of October 2022, Pelosi had voted in line with Joe Biden's stated position 100% of the time.

Foreign affairs

China/Hong Kong/Taiwan

Since the 1989 Tiananmen Square protests, Pelosi has opposed expanding trade relationships with China until it improves its human rights record. As part of a Congressional delegation she unfurled a banner in the square in 1991, provoking a confrontation with Chinese police. Pelosi advocated for Chinese political prisoners and dissidents to be able to come to the United States. In 1999, ahead of Chinese Premier Zhu Rongji's visit to the US for talks over World Trade Organization admission for China, Pelosi called on President Clinton and Vice President Gore to ask Zhu to recognize the 1989 protests as a pro-democracy effort.

In 2008, after a meeting with the Dalai Lama and officials in the Tibetan government-in-exile, Pelosi criticized the People's Republic of China for its handling of the unrest in Tibet; addressing a crowd of thousands of Tibetans in Dharamsala, India, Pelosi called on "freedom-loving people" worldwide to denounce China for its human rights abuses in Tibet. The same year, Pelosi commended the European Parliament for its "bold decision" to award the Sakharov Prize for Freedom of Thought to Chinese dissident and human rights activist Hu Jia, and called upon the Chinese government "to immediately and unconditionally release Hu Jia from prison and to respect the fundamental freedoms of all the people in China."

In 2010, Pelosi backed a bill naming China a currency manipulator, which would appease exporters.

Pelosi criticized the imprisonment of Hong Kong democracy activists in August 2017 for their roles in a protest at the Civic Square in front of the Central Government Complex in Hong Kong. She called the ruling an injustice that should "shock the conscience of the world".

Before the Trump administration took concrete measures against China in late March 2018, Pelosi and other Democratic leaders pressed Trump to focus more on China and impose real punishments, such as fulfilling his own campaign commitments to name China a currency manipulator and stop China from pressuring U.S. tech companies into giving up intellectual property rights. Pelosi urged Trump to take a strong stand against unfair market barriers in China.

In September 2019, Pelosi met with Hong Kong pro-democracy activist Joshua Wong on Capitol Hill; Chinese media responded by accusing Pelosi of "backing and encouraging radical activists".

On the eve of the 2022 Winter Olympics in Beijing, Pelosi advised American athletes competing: "I would say to our athletes, 'You're there to compete. Do not risk incurring the anger of the Chinese government, because they are ruthless'".

On August 2, 2022, Pelosi became the highest-ranking U.S. government official to visit Taiwan in 25 years. President Joe Biden discouraged but did not prevent Pelosi from traveling to Taiwan, and the White House later affirmed her right to visit the nation. Senate Minority Leader Mitch McConnell and 25 Senate Republicans backed Pelosi's decision to visit, issuing a joint statement that also supported the trip. Her trip triggered a new round of hostilities in the already tense relationship between the U.S. and China. During and after her visit, China undertook a series of retaliatory measures against Taiwan and the United States. Pelosi said her visit was a sign of the U.S. Congress's commitment to Taiwan. She called Taiwan one of the "freest societies in the world" during her visit.

Colombia
Pelosi publicly scolded Colombian president Álvaro Uribe during Uribe's May 2007 state visit to America. Pelosi met with Uribe and later released a statement that she and other members of Congress had "expressed growing concerns about the serious allegations" of links between paramilitary groups and Colombian government officials. Pelosi also came out against the Colombian free-trade agreement.

Cuba

In 2008, Pelosi said: "For years, I have opposed the embargo on Cuba. I don't think it's been successful, and I think we have to remove the travel bans and have more exchanges—people to people exchanges with Cuba." In 2015, Pelosi supported President Obama's Cuban Thaw, a rapprochement between the U.S. and Castro's regime in Cuba, and visited Havana for meetings with high-level officials.

First Gulf War
Pelosi opposed U.S. intervention in the 1991 Gulf War.

Iran

In an interview on February 15, 2007, Pelosi said that Bush consistently said he supports a diplomatic resolution to differences with Iran "and I take him at his word". At the same time, she said, "I do believe that Congress should assert itself, though, and make it very clear that there is no previous authority for the president, any president, to go into Iran". On January 12, 2007, Congressman Walter B. Jones of North Carolina introduced a resolution requiring that—absent a national emergency created by an attack, or a demonstrably imminent attack, by Iran upon the United States or its armed forces—the president must consult with Congress and receive specific authorization prior to initiating any use of military force against Iran. This resolution was removed from a military spending bill for the war in Iraq by Pelosi on March 13, 2007.

In July 2015, Pelosi said she was convinced Obama would have enough votes to secure the Iran nuclear deal, crediting the president with having made a "very strong and forceful presentation of his case supporting the nuclear agreement with Iran" and called the deal "a diplomatic masterpiece".

In 2016, Pelosi argued against two bills that if enacted would block Iran's access to the dollar and impose sanctions for its ballistic missile program: "Regardless of whether you supported the Joint Comprehensive Plan of Action (JCPOA), we all agree that Iran must not possess a nuclear weapon. At this time, the JCPOA is the best way to achieve this critical goal."

In May 2018, after Trump announced his intention to withdraw from the Iran nuclear deal, Pelosi said the decision was an abdication of American leadership and "particularly senseless, disturbing & dangerous".

Iraq War

In 2002, Pelosi opposed the Iraq Resolution authorizing President George W. Bush to use military force against Iraq, which passed the House on a 296–133 vote. Pelosi said that "unilateral use of force without first exhausting every diplomatic remedy and other remedies and making a case to the American people will be harmful to our war on terrorism." In explaining her opposition to the resolution, Pelosi said CIA Director George Tenet had told Congress the likelihood of Saddam Hussein's launching an attack on the U.S. using weapons of mass destruction was low, saying: "This is about the Constitution It is about this Congress asserting its right to declare war when we are fully aware what the challenges are to us. It is about respecting the United Nations and a multilateral approach, which is safer for our troops."

Although Pelosi voted against the Iraq War, anti-war activists in San Francisco protested against her voting to continue funding the war. UC Berkeley political scientist Bruce Cain said Pelosi had to balance the demands of her anti-war constituency against the moderate views of Democrats in tight races around the country in her role as minority leader. Pelosi has never faced a serious challenger to her left in her district.

Israel

Pelosi has reaffirmed that "America and Israel share an unbreakable bond: in peace and war; and in prosperity and in hardship". She has emphasized that "a strong relationship between the United States and Israel has long been supported by both Democrats and Republicans. America's commitment to the safety and security of the State of Israel is unwavering... [h]owever, the war in Iraq has made both America and Israel less safe." Pelosi's voting record shows consistent support for Israel. Pelosi voted in favor of the Jerusalem Embassy Act of 1995, which urged the federal government to relocate the American embassy in Israel to Jerusalem. Before the 2006 elections in the Palestinian Authority, she voted for a Congressional initiative that disapproved of participation in the elections by Hamas and other organizations the legislation defined as terrorist. She agrees with the current U.S. stance in support of land-for-peace. She has applauded Israeli "hopeful signs" of offering land while criticizing Palestinian "threats" of not demonstrating peace in turn. Pelosi has said, "If the Palestinians agree to coordinate with Israel on the evacuation, establish the rule of law, and demonstrate a capacity to govern, the world may be convinced that finally there is a real partner for peace".

During the 2006 Lebanon War, Pelosi voted in favor of Resolution 921: "...seizure of Israeli soldiers by Hezbollah terrorists was an unprovoked attack and Israel has the right, and indeed the obligation, to respond." She argues that organizations and political bodies in the Mideast like Hamas and Hezbollah "have a greater interest in maintaining a state of hostility with Israel than in improving the lives of the people they claim to represent". Pelosi asserts that civilians on both sides of the border "have been put at risk by the aggression of Hamas and Hezbollah" in part for their use of "civilians as shields by concealing weapons in civilian areas".

In September 2008, Pelosi hosted a reception in Washington with Israeli Speaker of the Knesset Dalia Itzik, along with 20 members of Congress, where they toasted the "strong friendship" between Israel and the United States. During the ceremony, Pelosi held up replica dog tags of the three Israeli soldiers captured by Hezbollah and Hamas in 2006 and said she keeps them as a "symbol of the sacrifices made, sacrifices far too great by the people of the state of Israel".

Pelosi supported Israel in the 2014 Israel–Gaza conflict. In March 2018 Pelosi said, "There is no greater political accomplishment in the 20th Century than the establishment of the State of Israel." Pelosi condemned Rep. Ilhan Omar of Minnesota for posting controversial tweets related to Jews and Israel. In March 2019, she said, "Israel and America are connected now and forever. We will never allow anyone to make Israel a wedge issue."

In January 2017, Pelosi voted against a House resolution that would condemn the UN Security Council Resolution 2334. This UN Security Council Resolution called Israeli settlement building in the occupied Palestinian territories in the West Bank a "flagrant violation" of international law and a major obstacle to peace. She condemned the Boycott, Divestment, and Sanctions (BDS) movement targeting Israel.

Pelosi has voiced heavy criticism over Israel's plan to annex parts of the West Bank and the Jordan Valley. She said Israeli annexation would undermine U.S. national security interests. Pelosi said that Democrats are taking "a great pride" in Barack Obama’s Memorandum of Understanding (MOU) that Israel signed with the Obama administration in 2016, for a guarantee of $38billion in defense assistance over a decade.

North Korea
Nancy Pelosi is one of the few members of Congress to have traveled to North Korea. She has expressed concern about the danger of nuclear proliferation from the North Korean regime, and the ongoing problems of hunger and oppression imposed by that country's leadership.

In August 2017, following Trump's warning that North Korea "will be met with fire and fury like the world has never seen" in the event of further threats to the United States, Pelosi said the comments were "recklessly belligerent and demonstrate a grave lack of appreciation for the severity of the North Korean nuclear situation. His saber-rattling and provocative, impulsive rhetoric erode our credibility."

In November 2017, after the Pentagon sent a letter to lawmakers stating a ground invasion was the only way to destroy all North Korea's nuclear weapons without concern for having missed any, Pelosi said she was concerned about Pyongyang's selling nuclear technology to third parties and called for the United States to "exhaust every other remedy".

In June 2018, after Trump praised North Korean leader Kim Jong-un, Pelosi said in a statement, "In his haste to reach an agreement, President Trump elevated North Korea to the level of the United States while preserving the regime's status quo."

Russia

In December 2017, Pelosi wrote a letter to Speaker Paul Ryan advocating for the continued House investigation into Russian interference in the 2016 election on the grounds that Americans deserved "a comprehensive and fair investigation into Russia's attack" and "America's democracy and national security" being at stake. Pelosi cited the need for Congress to "fully investigate Russia's assault on our election systems to prevent future foreign attacks".

In February 2018, after the release of a Republican report alleging surveillance abuses by the Justice Department, Pelosi accused Trump of siding with Russian president Vladimir Putin at the expense of preserving intelligence sources and methods. In July, Pelosi asserted that Trump was afraid to mention the 12 indictments against people connected to the intelligence community in Russia during his meeting with Putin and questioned what intelligence the Russians had on Trump to cause his behavior. She said Putin would not be welcomed by Congress even if he visited Washington as a result of his actions: "Putin's ongoing attacks on our elections and on Western democracies and his illegal actions in Crimea and the rest of Ukraine deserve the fierce, unanimous condemnation of the international community, not a VIP ticket to our nation's capital." She called for House Speaker Ryan to "make clear that there is not — and never will be — an invitation for a thug like Putin to address the United States Congress."

On multiple occasions, Pelosi said of Trump, "With him, all roads lead to Putin," including with regard to the Trump-Ukraine scandal, a lack of action against the alleged Russian bounty program, and Trump's incitement of the January 6 United States Capitol attack.

Syria, Libya, and Afghanistan
Pelosi supports the Syria Accountability Act and Iran Freedom and Support Act. In a speech at the AIPAC 2005 annual conference, Pelosi said that "for too long, leaders from both parties haven't done enough" to put pressure on Russia and China who are providing Iran with technological information on nuclear issues and missiles. "If evidence of participation by other nations in Iran's nuclear program is discovered, I will insist that the Administration use, rather than ignore, the evidence in determining how the U.S. deals with that nation or nations on other issues." In April 2007, Pelosi visited Syria, where she met Foreign Minister Walid Muallem, Vice President Farouk al-Sharaa and President Bashar Al-Assad, despite President Bush efforts to isolate Syria, because of militants crossing from Syria into Iraq, and supporting Hezbollah and Hamas. During her visit, she conveyed Israeli Prime Minister Ehud Olmert message for peace, and toured in Al-Hamidiyah Souq, and the Umayyad Mosque.

Pelosi supported the NATO-led military intervention in Libya in 2011. She also favored arming Syria's rebel fighters.

In January 2019, Pelosi criticized President Trump's planned withdrawal of U.S. troops from Syria and Afghanistan. She called Trump's announcement a "Christmas gift to Vladimir Putin". In an October 2019 letter to Democratic caucus members, Pelosi wrote that both parties were condemning President Trump's deserting the US's "Kurdish allies in a foolish attempt to appease an authoritarian strongman" Recep Tayyip Erdoğan of Turkey and opined that the decision "poses a dire threat to regional security and stability, and sends a dangerous message to Iran and Russia, as well as our allies, that the United States is no longer a trusted partner". Later that month, she visited Jordan to discuss the Syrian situation with King Abdullah II. Afterwards, she went to Afghanistan, where she met President Ashraf Ghani and chief executive officer Abdullah Abdullah, and she was also briefed by U.S. diplomats on reconciliation efforts with the Taliban.

Turkey
In mid-October 2007, after the House Foreign Affairs Committee passed a resolution to label the 1915 killing of Armenians by Ottoman Turks as genocide, Pelosi pledged to bring the measure to a vote. The draft resolution prompted warnings from President Bush and fierce criticism from Turkey, with Turkey's Prime Minister saying that approval of the resolution would endanger U.S.–Turkey relations. After House support eroded, the measure's sponsors dropped their call for a vote, and in late October Pelosi agreed to set the matter aside.

The resolution was passed during Pelosi's second term as Speaker. The House voted 405 to 11 in October 2019 to confirm the resolution.

Ukraine
On April 30, 2022, Pelosi met with President Volodymyr Zelenskyy in Kyiv, to pledge U.S. support for Ukraine during the Russian invasion.

Electoral history

Pelosi's only close race so far has been in the special election to succeed U.S. Representative Sala Burton after her death in February 1987. Pelosi defeated San Francisco Supervisor Harry Britt in the Democratic primary with 36 percent of the vote to his 32 percent, then Republican Harriet Ross by more than 2-to-1. Since then, Pelosi has enjoyed overwhelming support in her political career, collecting 76 and 77 percent of the vote in  1988 and 1990. She has continued to post landslide victories since, dropping beneath 80 percent of the vote only three times in general elections. Due to the 2020 United States redistricting cycle from the 2020 Census, Pelosi now represents , which covers San Francisco.

Personal life

Nancy D'Alesandro met Paul Francis Pelosi while she was attending college. They married in Baltimore at the Cathedral of Mary Our Queen on September 7, 1963. They moved to New York after they wed, then moved to San Francisco in 1969, where Paul's brother Ronald Pelosi was a member of the City and County of San Francisco's Board of Supervisors.

Nancy and Paul Pelosi have five children, including Christine and Alexandra, and nine grandchildren. Alexandra, a journalist, covered the Republican presidential campaigns in 2000 and made a film about the experience, Journeys with George. In 2007, Christine published a book, Campaign Boot Camp: Basic Training for Future Leaders.

Pelosi resides in the Pacific Heights neighborhood of San Francisco. Her 2016 financial disclosure report lists among her assets a combined home and vineyard in St. Helena, California, two commercial buildings in San Francisco, and a townhouse in Loomis, California. In January 2021, her San Francisco home was vandalized with graffiti, messages of "[c]ancel rent" were left on her garage, along with fake blood and a severed pig's head.

Financial status

The nonpartisan OpenSecrets estimated in 2009 that Pelosi's average net worth was approximately $58 million, ranking her 13th among 25 wealthiest members of Congress. In 2014, OpenSecrets reported Pelosi's average net worth almost doubled to approximately $101 million, ranking her 8th out of the 25 wealthiest members of Congress. Business Insider reported that Pelosi's worth was $26.4million in 2012 and made her the 13th richest member of Congress. In 2014, Roll Call estimated that Pelosi's net worth was $29.35million, ranking her the 15th wealthiest member of Congress.

Roll Call said Pelosi's earnings are connected to her husband's heavy investments in stocks that include Apple, Disney, Comcast and Facebook. Roll Call reported that the couple have $13.46million in liabilities including mortgages on seven properties. According to Roll Call, Pelosi and her husband hold properties "worth at least $14.65million, including a St. Helena vineyard in Napa Valley worth at least $5million and commercial real estate in San Francisco".

As of 2021, Pelosi's net worth was valued at $120 million, making her the 6th richest person in Congress. According to journalist Glenn Greenwald, the Pelosis have traded $33 million worth of tech stocks over the past two years, including Apple, Amazon, Microsoft, Facebook, and Google stocks. In May and June 2021, Pelosi's husband purchased stocks in tech companies such as Alphabet, Amazon, and Apple, netting a gain of $5.3 million. This occurred even while Speaker Pelosi was working on anti-trust legislation to better regulate the tech industry. The CEO of Apple, Tim Cook, had called Pelosi to lobby her in opposition to the new regulations. Pelosi opposes increasing regulations on stock trades by members of congress, stating that "we're a free market economy" and congresspeople "should be able to participate in that". This comment drew strong criticism, including from Democrats who favor banning stock trades by members of Congress.

Involvement in Italian-American community

Pelosi is a board member of the National Organization of Italian American Women. She served for 13 years as a board member of the National Italian American Foundation (NIAF). In 2007, she received the NIAF Special Achievement Award for Public Advocacy and remains involved in the foundation.

Holy Communion

On May 20, 2022, Salvatore Cordileone, archbishop of San Francisco, announced that Pelosi would be barred from receiving Holy Communion because of her support of pro-choice abortion policies. Cordileone had communicated his concerns on April 7, 2022, writing, "should you not publicly repudiate your advocacy for abortion 'rights' or else refrain from referring to your Catholic faith in public and receiving Holy Communion, I would have no choice but to make a declaration, in keeping with Canon 915, that you are not to be admitted to Holy Communion."

On June 29, 2022, Pelosi received Communion at a Papal Mass presided over by Pope Francis in Rome at St. Peter's Basilica.

2022 home invasion

In October 2022, while Pelosi was in Washington, D.C., an intruder entered her San Francisco home demanding to know her whereabouts, and attacked her husband, Paul Pelosi, with a hammer. Police arrested a suspect, 42-year-old David DePape, at the scene, who has been charged federally with attempting to kidnap Nancy Pelosi and assaulting a relative of a federal official, as well as six state charges.

Honors and decorations

See also

 Electoral history of Nancy Pelosi
 Know Your Power
 List of female speakers of legislatures in the United States
 Women in the United States House of Representatives

References

Further reading

External links

 Congresswoman Nancy Pelosi official U.S. House website
 Nancy Pelosi for Congress campaign website
 
 

 Nancy Pelosi  Video produced by Makers: Women Who Make America

Articles
 "Trinity Graduates Win Re-election: House Democratic Leader Nancy Pelosi '62 Poised to Become Speaker, Kansas Governor Kathleen Sebelius '70 Wins Second Term", Trinity Washington University, November 8, 2006
 "Rolling With Pelosi", Newsweek, October 23, 2006
 "Pelosi mines 'California gold' for Dems nationwide: Personal skills, wide network of wealthy donors help party's House leader gather millions", San Francisco Chronicle, April 3, 2006
 "Pelosi rides high", The Economist, February 22, 2007
 "This Is What a Speaker Looks Like", Winter 2007 cover story, Ms.
 "Opinion | How Nancy Pelosi's unlikely rise turned her into the most powerful woman in U.S. history: A troublemaker with a gavel", by Karen Tumulty, The Washington Post, March 25, 2020

}

 
1940 births
Living people
20th-century American politicians
20th-century American women politicians
20th-century Roman Catholics
21st-century American politicians
21st-century American women politicians
21st-century Roman Catholics
American people of Italian descent
Articles containing video clips
California Democratic Party chairs
Catholics from California
Catholics from Maryland
Democratic Party members of the United States House of Representatives from California
Female members of the United States House of Representatives
Grand Cordons of the Order of the Rising Sun
Grand Crosses of the Order of the Golden Heart
Italian-American culture in Baltimore
Italian-American culture in California
Knights Grand Cross of the Order of Merit of the Italian Republic
American LGBT rights activists
Minority leaders of the United States House of Representatives
Nancy
Politicians from Baltimore
Politicians from San Francisco
Recipients of the Order of Princess Olga, 3rd class
Recipients of the Order of Propitious Clouds
Speakers of the United States House of Representatives
Trinity Washington University alumni
Women in California politics
Women legislative speakers
Women opposition leaders